Mark Deady (born January 2, 1967) is an American Olympic middle-distance runner. He represented his country in the men's 1500 meters at the 1988 Summer Olympics. His time was a 3:41.91 in the first heat, and a 3:39.47 in the semifinals.

In 1985, Mark Deady was State Champion for Stevenson High School, Lincolnshire, Illinois. He was the Boys Class AA winner in the 1600 meter run. His time of 4:07.45 was a new State Record and stood until 2009 when Jeff Thode of J.B. Conan's High School ran to a winning time of 4:04.

References 

1967 births
Living people
American male middle-distance runners
Olympic track and field athletes of the United States
People from Lincolnshire, Illinois
Sportspeople from the Chicago metropolitan area
Track and field athletes from Illinois
Athletes (track and field) at the 1988 Summer Olympics